Elmwood is a historic plantation and national historic district located near Lewis, Granville County, North Carolina.  The plantation house was built in 1805, and is a two-story, three bay Georgian style heavy timber frame dwelling.  It has a gable roof and double-shouldered exterior end chimneys.

It was listed on the National Register of Historic Places in 1988.

References

Plantation houses in North Carolina
Houses on the National Register of Historic Places in North Carolina
Historic districts on the National Register of Historic Places in North Carolina
Georgian architecture in North Carolina
Houses completed in 1805
Houses in Granville County, North Carolina
National Register of Historic Places in Granville County, North Carolina
1805 establishments in North Carolina